Matthew Fisher (born 10 November 1999) is a New Zealand cricketer. He made his Twenty20 debut on 13 December 2019, for Northern Districts in the 2019–20 Super Smash. Prior to his T20 debut, he was named in New Zealand's squad for the 2018 Under-19 Cricket World Cup. He made his List A debut on 8 December 2020, for Northern Districts in the 2020–21 Ford Trophy. He made his first-class debut on 27 March 2021, for Northern Districts in the 2020–21 Plunket Shield season.

References

External links
 

1999 births
Living people
New Zealand cricketers
Northern Districts cricketers
Place of birth missing (living people)